Achi Avelino (born 4 June 1993), better known mononymously by his stage name Avelino, is a British rapper and singer of Congolese and Angolan descent from Tottenham, London, known for his "unique tone" and "deep wordplay".

Career

2011–2014: Beginnings
Originally rapping under the monikers AA (derived from his initials), Avelino first released freestyles on YouTube. His debut mixtape, Underdog Music, was released in 2013 through More Music Records. The project was credited by GRM Daily's Charlie-Louise Akintilo as being "edgy" and "refreshing".

2014–2015: Commercial breakthrough and Iconic Ambition
Avelino rose to prominence in 2014 following the release of his second mixtape, Iconic Ambition, which was featured on DJ Semtex's Mixtape Top 5 on BBC Radio 1Xtra. He went on to support Stormzy on tour throughout 2015, having previously collaborated on the mixtape track "No Comment".

2015–present: Collaboration with Wretch 32
Throughout 2015, Avelino was championed by fellow Tottenham MC Wretch 32. The two rappers released a joint mixtape, entitled Young Fire, Old Flame, on 18 December 2015, to positive reception. Avelino was Young Fire, whereas Wretch 32 was Old Flame. The mixtape was accompanied by a Fire in the Booth freestyle on BBC Radio 1, which was heralded by host Charlie Sloth as the "hardest" Fire in the Booth of all time, and by Noiseys Joe Zadeh as "staggering". Wretch and Avelino also collaborated on the promotional singles "M.O.E" and "Freedom", as well as an unofficial remix of Kanye West's "No More Parties in LA", renamed "No More Parties in DSTRKT". The two are scheduled to perform the mixtape at KOKO on 12 May 2016.

On 7 April 2016, Avelino released his debut EP, FYO, for free download. It was executive produced by Raf Riley. The project, which stands for Fuck Your Opinion, has received considerable support from BBC Radio 1; "Youniverse" has been played by MistaJam, and the title track was added to 1Xtra's C-list playlist on 6–12 May 2016. Supporters of the song include Annie Mac and Charlie Sloth. The EP topped Semtex's Mixtape Top 5 chart. He is currently working on his debut studio album.

Avelino released a new single, "On a Roll", for free download via SoundCloud on 30 August 2016. The song features guest vocals from Abra Cadabra, and has been played by DJ Target on 1Xtra. The same week, Avelino featured on Wretch 32's single "Open Conversation & Mark Duggan", released on 1 September 2016, a day prior to his third studio album, Growing Over Life.

On 10 February 2017, Avelino released a single titled "Energy" which features grime heavyweights, Skepta and Stormzy. The single was used by EA Sports game, FIFA 18 demo and is being touted as the headline song on FIFA 18 soundtrack. At the time of writing, Energy's official music video has racked up over 1.5 million views on YouTube and various remixes, notably with regular collaborator Wretch 32, have been released.

Personal life
Avelino is an avid supporter of Manchester United F.C.

Discography

Extended plays

Mixtapes

References

1993 births
Living people
Black British male rappers
English people of Angolan descent
English people of Democratic Republic of the Congo descent
Rappers from London
People from Tottenham
Place of birth missing (living people)